The Steven Wilson Remixes is a box set by the English progressive rock band Yes. Released on 29 June 2018, it compiles remixed versions of five of the band's albums—The Yes Album (1971), Fragile (1971), Close to the Edge (1972), Tales from Topographic Oceans (1973), and Relayer (1974)—overseen by Steven Wilson.

Background

The remixes were originally released one-by-one from 2013 through 2016: Close to the Edge was the first to receive a remix, followed by The Yes Album in 2014, Fragile in 2015 and Tales from Topographic Oceans and Relayer in 2016. Roger Dean, a longtime associate of the band, created alternate covers for Close to the Edge and Tales from Topographic Oceans; the other albums' covers received minor alterations.

Track listing

The Yes Album

Side one

 "Yours Is No Disgrace" (Jon Anderson, Chris Squire, Steve Howe, Tony Kaye, Bill Bruford) – 9:40
 "Clap" (Howe) – 3:16
 "Starship Trooper" – 9:29
"Life Seeker" (Anderson)
"Disillusion" (Squire)
"Würm" (Howe)

Side two

 "I've Seen All Good People" – 6:55
"Your Move" (Anderson)
"All Good People" (Squire)
 "A Venture" (Anderson) – 3:20
 "Perpetual Change" (Anderson, Squire) – 8:57

Fragile

Side one

 "Roundabout" (Anderson, Howe) – 8:29
 "Cans and Brahms" (Johannes Brahms, arranged by Rick Wakeman) – 1:34
 "We Have Heaven" (Anderson) – 1:38
 "South Side of the Sky" (Anderson, Squire) – 7:57

Side two

 "Five Per Cent for Nothing" (Bruford) – 0:35
 "Long Distance Runaround" (Anderson) – 3:28
 "The Fish (Schindleria Praematurus)" (Squire) – 2:36
 "Mood for a Day" (Howe) – 2:55
 "Heart of the Sunrise" (Anderson, Squire, Bruford) – 10:34

Close to the Edge

Side one

 "Close to the Edge" – 18:43
"The Solid Time of Change" (Anderson, Howe)
"Total Mass Retain" (Anderson, Howe)
"I Get Up, I Get Down" (Anderson, Howe)
"Seasons of Man" (Anderson, Howe)

Side two

 "And You and I" – 10:12
"Cord of Life" (Anderson, Squire, Howe, Bruford)
"Eclipse" (Anderson, Squire, Bruford)
"The Preacher, the Teacher" (Anderson, Squire, Howe, Bruford)
"Apocalypse" (Anderson, Squire, Howe, Bruford)
 "Siberian Khatru" (Anderson, Howe, Wakeman) – 8:56

Tales from Topographic Oceans

All tracks written by Yes.

Side one

 "The Revealing Science of God (Dance of the Dawn)" – 20:27

Side two

 "The Remembering (High the Memory)" – 20:38

Side three

 "The Ancient (Giants Under the Sun)" – 18:34

Side four

 "Ritual (Nous Sommes du Soleil)" – 21:35

Relayer

All tracks written by Yes.

Side one

 "The Gates of Delirium" – 21:55

Side two

 "Sound Chaser" – 9:25
 "To Be Over" – 9:08

Note: Streaming editions of the album split the following multi-section pieces into separate tracks:
"Close to the Edge" is split into four tracks, corresponding to each of its segments.
Each song on Tales from Topographic Oceans is split into five tracks each.
"The Gates of Delirium" is split into three tracks.

Personnel

On The Yes Album:

Jon Anderson
Chris Squire
Steve Howe
Bill Bruford
Tony Kaye

On Fragile and Close to the Edge:

Jon Anderson
Chris Squire
Steve Howe
Bill Bruford
Rick Wakeman

On Tales from Topographic Oceans:

Jon Anderson
Chris Squire
Steve Howe
Alan White
Rick Wakeman

On Relayer:

Jon Anderson
Chris Squire
Steve Howe
Alan White
Patrick Moraz

References

Yes (band) remix albums
2018 remix albums